Alopoglossus copii, known commonly as the drab shade lizard, is a species of lizard in the family Alopoglossidae. The species is native to northwestern South America.

Etymology
The specific name, copii, is in honor of American herpetologist Edward Drinker Cope.

Geographic range
A. copii is found in Colombia, Ecuador, and Peru.

Habitat

Reproduction
A. copii is oviparous.

References

Further reading
Boulenger GA (1885). Catalogue of the Lizards in the British Museum (Natural History). Second Edition. Volume II. ... Teiidæ .... London: Trustees of the British Museum (Natural History). (Taylor and Francis, printers). xiii + 497 pp. + Plates I-XXIV. (Alopoglossus copii, new species, pp. 383–384 + Plate XX, figures 1, 1a, 1b, 1c, 1d).
Duellman WE (1978). "The Biology of an Equatorial Herpetofauna in Amazonian Ecuador". University of Kansas Museum of Natural History Miscellaneous Publications (65): 1–352. (Alopoglossus copii, p. 210, Figure 123).
Goicoechea N, Frost DR, De la Riva I, Pellegrino KCM, Sites J, Rodrigues MT, Padial JM (2016). "Molecular systematics of teioid lizards (Teioidea/Gymnophthalmoidea: Squamata) based on the analysis of 48 loci under tree-alignment and similarity-alignment". Cladistics 32 (6): 624–671.
Köhler G, Diethert H-H, Veselý M (2012). "A Contribution to the Knowledge of the Lizard Genus Alopoglossus (Squamata: Gymnophthalmidae)". Herpetological Monographs 26 (1): 173–188. (in English, with an abstract in Spanish).

Alopoglossus
Reptiles described in 1885
Taxa named by George Albert Boulenger